The Sacred Sites of Modderpoort are located in the Eastern Free State of South Africa.  Four sites are included in the overall collection:
The San Rock Paintings
The Anglican Church and Cemetery
Mantsopa's Grave
The Cave Church (or Rose Chapel)

World Heritage Status 

The collection of sites was added to the UNESCO World Heritage Tentative List on June 30, 1998 in the Cultural category, and removed from the list in 2011

Notes

References 
 Modderpoort Sacred Sites (#) - UNESCO World Heritage Centre Accessed 2009-03-03.

Sacred natural sites
Tourist attractions in the Free State (province)
Religion in South Africa
Rock art in Africa
Buildings and structures in the Free State (province)